"I Saw Her Standing There" is a song by the English rock band the Beatles written by Paul McCartney and John Lennon. It is the opening track on the band's 1963 debut UK album Please Please Me and their debut US album Introducing... The Beatles.

In December 1963, Capitol Records released the song in the United States as the B-side on the label's first single by the Beatles, "I Want to Hold Your Hand". While the A-side topped the US Billboard chart for seven weeks starting 1 February 1964, "I Saw Her Standing There" entered the Billboard Hot 100 on 8 February 1964, remaining there for 11 weeks, peaking at No. 14. The song placed on the Cashbox chart for only one week at No. 100 on the same week of its Billboard debut. In 2004, "I Saw Her Standing There" was ranked No. 139 on Rolling Stones list of the 500 Greatest Songs of All Time.

Composition
Originally titled "Seventeen", the song was conceived by McCartney when driving home from a Beatles' concert in Southport, Merseyside as a modern take on the traditional song "As I Roved Out", a version of "Seventeen Come Sunday" that he had heard in Liverpool in 1960. According to Beatles biographer Mark Lewisohn, McCartney first worked out the chords and arrangement on an acoustic guitar at the family home of his Liverpool friend and fellow musician Rory Storm on the evening of 22 October 1962. Two days later, McCartney was writing lines for the song during a visit to London with his then-girlfriend Celia Mortimer, who was seventeen at the time herself. The song was completed about a month later at McCartney's Forthlin Road home in collaboration with Lennon and performed as part of their set in December 1962 in the Star-Club in Hamburg.

McCartney later described in Beat Instrumental how he went about the song's composition: "Here's one example of a bit I pinched from someone: I used the bass riff from 'Talkin' About You' by Chuck Berry in 'I Saw Her Standing There'. I played exactly the same notes as he did and it fitted our number perfectly. Even now, when I tell people, I find few of them believe me; therefore, I maintain that a bass riff hasn't got to be original." Berry's "I'm Talking About You" was performed by The Beatles and the song appears on their albums Live! at the Star-Club in Hamburg, Germany; 1962 and On Air – Live at the BBC Volume 2.

The lyrics were written in a Liverpool Institute exercise book. Remember: The Recollections and Photographs of the Beatles, a book by McCartney's brother Mike McCartney, includes a photograph taken in the front room of his home of Lennon and McCartney writing the song while strumming their acoustic guitars and reading the exercise book. It typified how Lennon and McCartney would later work in partnership, as McCartney subsequently reflected: "I had 'She was just seventeen,' and then 'never been a beauty queen'. When I showed it to John, he screamed with laughter, and said 'You're joking about that line, aren't you?'" According to McCartney, "We came up with, 'You know what I mean.' Which was good, because you don't know what I mean." "It was one of the first times he ever went 'What? Must change that ...'" Lennon said: "That's Paul doing his usual good job of producing what George Martin used to call a 'potboiler'. I helped with a couple of the lyrics." The songwriting credit on the Please Please Me liner notes is "McCartney–Lennon" which differs from the more familiar "Lennon–McCartney" that appears on subsequent releases.

Recording
The first live recording (a slow version of the song) was made at the Cavern Club at the end of 1962. Lennon did not play rhythm guitar; he played harmonica in the introduction and during the verses. Lennon and McCartney laughed when they sang "Well we danced all night/And I held her tight/And I held her hand in mine" the second time.

The song was recorded at EMI Studios on 11 February 1963 and engineered by Norman Smith, as part of the marathon recording session that produced 10 of the 14 songs on Please Please Me. The Beatles were not present for the mixing session on 25 February 1963. It was not common practice for bands to be present at such sessions at that time.

On the album, the song starts with a rousing "One, two, three, four!" count-in by McCartney. Usually count-ins are edited off the final audio mix; however, record producer George Martin wanted to create the effect that the album was a live performance: "I had been up to the Cavern and I'd seen what they could do, I knew their repertoire, and I said 'Let's record every song you've got, come down to the studios and we'll just whistle through them in a day'". Martin took the count-in from take 9, which was considered 'especially spirited' and spliced it onto take 1. Music journalist Richard Williams suggested that this dramatic introduction to their debut album was just as stirring as Elvis Presley's "Well, it's one for the money, two for the show ..." on his opening track, "Blue Suede Shoes", for his debut album seven years earlier. It also made the point that the Beatles were a live band as, at that time, they opened their set with this song. On the first American release of the song, issued on Vee Jay Records, the count was edited out—but the "Four!" is still audible.

The full take 9 version of the song appears on the "Free as a Bird" CD single as a B side, released for the first time.

Take 2 of the song was released on The Beatles Bootleg Recordings 1963, which was an album released exclusively to iTunes in 2013.

Reception
In its contemporary review of the US single, Cash Box described it as an "engaging" song that is "hard-hitting teen stuff."

Charts

Weekly charts

Year-end charts

Certifications

Releases
British LP: Please Please Me
British EP: The Beatles (No. 1)
American LP: Introducing... The Beatles
American single: "I Want to Hold Your Hand"
American LP: Meet the Beatles!
Canadian LP: The Beatles' Long Tall Sally

Personnel
 Paul McCartney – lead vocals, bass guitar, hand claps
 John Lennon – rhythm guitar, harmony vocals, hand claps
 George Harrison – lead guitar, hand claps
 Ringo Starr – drums, hand claps
Personnel per Ian MacDonald

Later performances by Beatles

John Lennon
A live version was recorded at Madison Square Garden on 28 November 1974 by the Elton John Band with John Lennon, and released as the B-side to the former's "Philadelphia Freedom" single. The song is available on the Lennon box set, and on Elton John's To Be Continued... box set as well as the expanded CD edition of his 1976 live album Here and There and Elton John's Rare Masters. Lennon's introduction:

This was the last major live performance by Lennon. After Lennon's death, the track was released as a single and reached No. 40 on the UK Singles Chart in March 1981, making it the first time that any version of the song had entered the UK charts.

Paul McCartney
McCartney included "I Saw Her Standing There" on his live albums Tripping the Live Fantastic (1990), Back in the US (2002) and Back in the World (2003). In 1987, he recorded a new version for his album CHOBA B CCCP, but left it to outtakes. The song has become a mainstay of McCartney's live sets, and a special version was played when McCartney and his band returned to Liverpool in June 2008. It featured special guest drummer Dave Grohl, the lead singer of the Foo Fighters and ex-drummer of Nirvana. In 2007, McCartney performed a secret gig at Amoeba Music in Hollywood – this performance appeared on the EP Amoeba's Secret and earned him a Grammy Award for Best Solo Rock Vocal Performance nomination in 2009.

McCartney performed "I Saw Her Standing There" at the 1986 Prince's Trust Rock Gala, as part of the 10th anniversary celebration of HRH Prince Charles' charity. He was supported by an all-star band featuring Elton John, Eric Clapton, Phil Collins, Mark Knopfler, and Ray King. Interviewed at the time, McCartney said: "It is a good thrill playing with musicians of this calibre ... since it was a birthday thing, they wanted to do something silly at the end, and that's me". Paul McCartney also performed a duet of this song with Billy Joel during the inaugural concert at Citi Field in Flushing, New York.

George Harrison and Ringo Starr
George Harrison and Ringo Starr also performed the song with Bruce Springsteen, Billy Joel, Mick Jagger, and Bob Dylan, amongst others, at the Beatles' induction into the Rock and Roll Hall of Fame. This makes it the only song by the Beatles that all four members performed on stage during their respective solo careers to any extent.

Tiffany version

"I Saw Him Standing There" was recorded and released by Tiffany. It appeared on her debut self-titled album, changing the lyrics to "him" instead of "her". The track was re-recorded and remixed for single release.

In Japan, "Can't Stop a Heartbeat" was the B-side. She and the song were featured in TV commercials for Meiji's "Marble Chocolate".

Music video
The music video was a live performance of the song in front of thousands of screaming fans. Like her previous videos, it received considerable airplay on MTV and VH1.

Track listings and formats
Cassette single and 7-inch single

 "I Saw Him Standing There"
 "Gotta Be Love"
 "Mr. Mambo"

12-inch single
 "I Saw Him Standing There"

UK 7-inch single
 "I Saw Him Standing There"
 "Mr. Mambo"

Japanese 3-inch CD single
 "I Saw Him Standing There"
 "Can't Stop a Heartbeat"

Japanese CD EP
 "I Think We're Alone Now (extended version)"
 "I Saw Him Standing There (dance mix)"
 "Can't Stop a Heartbeat (long version)"
 "Mr. Mambo"
 "Can't Stop a Heartbeat (singalong version)"

Chart performance
Tiffany version

References

Bibliography

External links

 

Songs about teenagers
1963 songs
The Beatles songs
Song recordings produced by George Martin
Songs written by Lennon–McCartney
Elton John songs
The Supremes songs
Little Richard songs
Jerry Lee Lewis songs
The Tubes songs
The Who songs
Songs published by Northern Songs
1988 singles
Tiffany Darwish songs
MCA Records singles
Capitol Records singles
Parlophone singles
Songs about dancing
1963 singles
British rock-and-roll songs
The Crickets songs